Mallavaram is a village in Podili mandal, located in Prakasam district of the Indian state of Andhra Pradesh.

References 

Villages in Prakasam district